Athatcha Rahongthong (born March 11, 1997) is a Thai professional footballer who plays as a left back.

External links
 

1998 births
Living people
Athatcha Rahongthong
Association football defenders
Athatcha Rahongthong
Athatcha Rahongthong
Athatcha Rahongthong
Athatcha Rahongthong
Athatcha Rahongthong